Crispo may refer to:

People
Adriana Crispo, (died 1537), noblewoman, lady of Ios, Therasia and Antiparos in the Cyclades, before the conquest of the Ottoman Empire
Anthony Crispo, Lord of Syros (1429/1430 - 1494), became Lord of Syros in 1463 after his older brother Francesco's death
Antonio Crispo, Governor of the Duchy of the Archipelago (died 1505), Governor of the Duchy of the Archipelago between 1496 and 1505
Antonio Crispo, Governor of the Duchy of the Archipelago (died 1584), Governor of the Duchy of the Archipelago between 1544 and 1554
Francesco I Crispo, Patrizio Veneto (died 1397), the tenth Duke of the Archipelago through his marriage and the will of Venice
Giacomo Crispo, Governor of the Duchy of the Archipelago, (died 1505) was a Governor of the Duchy of the Archipelago in 1494
Giacomo I Crispo (or Jacopo) (1383–1418), the eleventh Duke of the Archipelago
Giacomo II Crispo (or Jacopo) (1426–1447), the thirteenth Duke of the Archipelago
Giacomo IV Crispo, the last Duke of the Archipelago, ruling from 1564, when he succeeded his father Giovanni IV Crispo
Gian Giacomo Crispo (1446–1453), the fourteenth Duke of the Archipelago
John Crispo (1933–2009), Canadian economist, author and educator
John II Crispo (1388–1433), the twelfth Duke of the Archipelago
Nicholas Crispo, Lord of Syros, Patrizio Veneto (1392–1450), became Lord of Syros in 1420 and Regent of the Duchy of the Archipelago 1447–1450
Tiberio Crispo (1498–1566), the son of Giovanni Battista Crispo and Silvia Ruffini, who, after her husband's death, was the mistress of Alessandro Farnese
William II Crispo (or Guglielmo) (1390–1463), the fifteenth Duke of the Archipelago, from 1453 to 1463

Other
Crispo, a tragedy by Tommaso Sgricci (1789–1836), premiered 1827, named after Flavius Julius Crispus

See also
Crispano
Crispiano
Crispino